National Waterways 6 is a waterway between Lakhipur and Bhanga of the Barak River.

NW 6
 Inland Waterways Authority of India started this project in  direct control of prime minister  narendra modi and now  is directed by sanjeev kumar

References

External links
 [https://web.archive.org/web/201505
23013735/http://iwai.gov.in/ Official website]

Waterways in India
Transport in Assam
Proposed transport infrastructure in India